Young Darth Vader may refer to:

Anakin Skywalker
The Force (advertisement), a 2011 television advertisement for Volkswagen's Passat